The 2020 Unibet Premier League Darts was a darts tournament organised by the Professional Darts Corporation – the sixteenth edition of the tournament. The event began on Thursday 6 February at the P&J Live in Aberdeen and ended with the Play-offs at the Ricoh Arena in Coventry on Thursday 15 October, after a delay was caused by the COVID-19 outbreak.

Michael van Gerwen was the four-time defending champion after defeating Rob Cross 11–5 in the 2019 final. However, he was eliminated from the competition in week 16, after an 8–2 defeat to Daryl Gurney, and a poor run of form saw him slip out of the playoffs, for the first time in his career.

Glen Durrant, who was making his debut in the tournament, finished the regular season in 1st place (becoming only the third player to do so, after van Gerwen and Phil Taylor, to set up a semi-final meeting between Gary Anderson. Durrant claimed a narrow 10–9 victory (including surviving 4 match darts from Anderson), before eventually winning the competition, by beating fellow debutant Nathan Aspinall 11–8 in the final to claim his first televised PDC title.

This was also the first time in Premier League Darts history that the four players that qualified for the finals had not appeared in the finals of the previous year's edition (the four players being van Gerwen, Gurney, Cross and James Wade).

On 12 March 2020, it was announced that the double-header due to be played in Rotterdam had been postponed due to coronavirus concerns. The following day it was announced that the Rotterdam dates would be moved to September, with the culmination of the tournament taking place there instead of London. On 16 March 2020. it was announced the round to be played in Newcastle would be moved to October, taking over as the tournament's final round.

The May dates were postponed on 9 April 2020, with the PDC announcing a fully rescheduled calendar, the play-offs now taking place in Sheffield. Further changes were announced in July and August, with the cancellation of the events in Birmingham, Belfast, Leeds, Berlin, Glasgow, Manchester, Newcastle, Sheffield, and the double header in Rotterdam; and the reinstatement of The O2 Arena as the host of the final. Ten nights were added to the calendar to be held behind closed doors at the Marshall Arena in Milton Keynes. The play-offs were subsequently moved to the Ricoh Arena in Coventry and also played behind closed doors.

Format
The tournament format will remain the same as 2019, with the only difference being the re-branding of 'contenders' to 'challengers' for this season.

Phase 1:
In each round, eight of the nine players play each other in four matches and the ninth player plays one match against one of the nine challengers. Phase 1 matches have a maximum of twelve legs, allowing for the winner being first to seven or a six-six draw. At the end of Phase 1, the bottom player is eliminated from the competition.

Phase 2:
In each round, the remaining eight players play each other in four matches. Phase 2 matches have a maximum of fourteen legs, allowing for the winner being first to eight or a seven-seven draw. At the end of Phase 2, the bottom four players in the league table are eliminated from the competition.

Play-off Night:
The top four players in the league table contest the two knockout semi-finals with 1st playing 4th and 2nd playing 3rd. The semi-finals are first to 10 legs (best of 19). The two winning semi-finalists meet in the final which is first to 11 legs (best of 21).

Venues
The only change of venues from 2019 to 2020 was the introduction of the P&J Live in Aberdeen, which hosted the opening night's action.

Following the COVID-19 outbreak, the rounds in Birmingham, Belfast, Leeds, Berlin, Rotterdam, Glasgow, Manchester, Newcastle and Sheffield were cancelled, with rounds being added in Milton Keynes to make up.

Prize money
The prize money for the 2020 tournament remained at £825,000.

Players
The players in this year's tournament were announced following the 2020 PDC World Darts Championship final on 1 January. The top four on the PDC Order of Merit are joined by five wildcards.

The format is similar to that of 2019, with 9 main players plus 9 invited players, now referred to as 'challengers' in a re-brand from the tag of 'contenders'. The 9 main players earn league points if they win or draw against the challengers. The challengers do not earn any league points but they earn financial bonuses if they win or draw their match.

League stage
Players in italics are "Challengers", and only play on that night.

6 February – Night 1 (Phase 1)
 P&J Live, Aberdeen

13 February – Night 2 (Phase 1)
 Motorpoint Arena Nottingham, Nottingham

20 February – Night 3 (Phase 1)
 Motorpoint Arena Cardiff, Cardiff

27 February – Night 4 (Phase 1)
 3Arena, Dublin

5 March – Night 5 (Phase 1)
 Westpoint Arena, Exeter

12 March – Night 6 (Phase 1)
 M&S Bank Arena, Liverpool

25 August – Night 7 (Phase 1)
 Marshall Arena, Milton Keynes

26 August – Night 8 (Phase 1)
 Marshall Arena, Milton Keynes

27 August – Night 9 (Phase 1) (Judgement Night)
 Marshall Arena, Milton Keynes

28 August – Night 10 (Phase 2)
 Marshall Arena, Milton Keynes

29 August – Night 11 (Phase 2)
 Marshall Arena, Milton Keynes

30 August – Night 12 (Phase 2)
 Marshall Arena, Milton Keynes

2 September – Night 13 (Phase 2)
 Marshall Arena, Milton Keynes

3 September – Night 14 (Phase 2)
 Marshall Arena, Milton Keynes

4 September – Night 15 (Phase 2)
 Marshall Arena, Milton Keynes

5 September – Night 16 (Phase 2)
 Marshall Arena, Milton Keynes

Play-offs – 15 October
 Ricoh Arena, Coventry

Table and streaks

Table
After the first nine rounds in phase 1, the bottom player in the table is eliminated. In phase 2, the eight remaining players play in a single match on each of the seven nights. The top four players then compete in the knockout semi-finals and final on the playoff night.

The nine challengers are not ranked in the table, but the main nine players can earn league points for a win or draw in the games against them.

Two points are awarded for a win and one point for a draw. When players are tied on points, leg difference is used first as a tie-breaker, after that legs won against throw and then tournament average.

W = Winner
RU = Runner Up

Streaks

Positions by Week

References

External links
 PDC Professional Darts Corporation, official website
 PDC Professional Darts Corporation, official website, Tournaments

2020
2020 in darts
2020 in British sport
2020 in Irish sport
Sports events postponed due to the COVID-19 pandemic